Paula Andrea Cabezas (born 21 August 1972) is a Chilean former professional tennis player.

Biography
Born in Santiago, Cabezas competed on the professional tour in the 1990s, mostly on the ITF Circuit, winning 14 singles and 17 doubles titles. Her WTA Tour performances include a semifinal appearance in the doubles at São Paulo in 1991, partnering with Andrea Vieira. She qualified for her only singles main draw at the 1995 Puerto Rico Open. She reached a best singles ranking of 212 in the world, attained in 1997.

During her career, she featured in a total of 39 ties for the Chile Fed Cup team. This included a World Group fixture against defending champions Spain in 1994, where she lost a singles match to world No. 2, Arantxa Sánchez Vicario. She won 49 matches overall, 23 of them in doubles, both of which are national records.

Cabezas represented Chile in doubles at the 1996 Atlanta Olympics and was a multiple Pan American Games medalist. She won a bronze medal at the 1991 Pan American Games in Havana and a silver at the 1999 Pan American Games in Winnipeg, both in doubles.

She now lives in Barcelona and competes on the ITF seniors circuit under Spanish nationality.

ITF Circuit finals

Singles: 19 (14 titles, 5 runner-ups)

Doubles: 25 (17 titles, 8 runner-ups)

References

External links
 
 
 

1972 births
Living people
Chilean female tennis players
Tennis players from Santiago
Chilean emigrants to Spain
Tennis players at the 1996 Summer Olympics
Olympic tennis players of Chile
Pan American Games silver medalists for Chile
Pan American Games bronze medalists for Chile
Pan American Games medalists in tennis
Tennis players at the 1991 Pan American Games
Tennis players at the 1999 Pan American Games
South American Games medalists in tennis
South American Games gold medalists for Chile
South American Games bronze medalists for Chile
Competitors at the 1990 South American Games
Competitors at the 1994 South American Games
Competitors at the 1998 South American Games
Medalists at the 1999 Pan American Games
20th-century Chilean women